The Newcastle Australian Football League was an Australian rules football competition in the city of Newcastle, New South Wales, Australia.

The first clubs (Northumberland, Lambton, Newcastle City, Singleton and Wallsend & Plattsburg) began in 1883, however the competition proper began in 1888 with teams contesting for the Black Diamond Cup, now Australia's oldest sporting trophy and was contested in the Black Diamond Australian Football League and continues to be contested in the AFL Hunter Central Coast competition.

In 1894, popularity of Australian rules waned. In 1948, after World War II, a 4 team competition was reborn - the first properly constituted competition in the region. The competing clubs were Waratah, Mayfield, Newcastle City and Broadmeadow.

After the 1999 season, the NAFL merged with the Central Coast AFL to form the Black Diamond Australian Football League.

History

1890s 
The history of Australian rules football in the Hunter Region dates back to 1881 when a club named Northumberland was founded. Rugby union was the only other football code played in the region at that same era, which had been introduced since 1876. During the 1880s over 14,000 people were enticed to the Newcastle district due to the coal mining industry that was rapidly expanding. Three brothers, George, Jim and John Duguid introduced the sport in 1883 and had previously played football on the goldfields of Ballarat. That same year was when the game was being played formally with the first clubs being formed. The foundation clubs were Newcastle City, Northumberland (Maitland), Singleton, Lambton and Wallsend & Plattsburg. Games in 1883 were played in the form of scratch matches and were hastily organised by the five clubs, each of these games seeing a large crowd attendance. 

The same year of 1883 saw the South Melbourne Football Club visit Maitland on July 17th 1883 to play against a team combined of clubs from Newcastle and Maitland, with South winning the game 6.9.47 to 5.10.40 at the Albion Ground in front of a crowd of approximately 500. The game was part of an onslaught by Victorian administrators to grow the game Australia wide, with the Victorian Football Association believing that the long-term future of the game was for it to be accepted in all six states.

The first recorded schoolboys game took place in 1885 between the Wickham and Wallsend Superior schools, Wickham winning 2.10.22 to 0.5.5. Sydney schools took well to the game but it didn't receive the same amount of support within Newcastle schools, the publicity being rare and only four schools in Newcastle playing competitively. The Northern District Football Association was established the following year in 1886 on August 30th when the momentum grew to start a competition for the sport in the district. Representatives from Wallsend, Newcastle City and Northumberland, as well as representatives from the Mount Zion, Carlton, Stockton, Summer Hill clubs. The month before in late July 1886, the Northern District side played host to a Queensland side at the Newcastle Cricket Ground in front of 1,500 people. The game was played while the Northern District side was on the way to an inter-colonial match in Sydney.

The Fitzroy Football Club visited Newcastle in 1888, followed by Port Melbourne the following year in 1889. Fitzroy were set to play a set of four matches during their Newcastle tour: May 26th vs Maitland District at the Albion Ground, May 29th vs Maitland Juniors at the Albion Ground, May 31 vs Newcastle District and June 2nd vs Combined North, both in Newcastle. These tours provoked latent celebrations and festivities, and created an unrivalled interest in Australian rules. Both Fitzroy and Port Melbourne were defeated by the Northern District side during their visits, with the Northern District side emerging victorious over Queensland in 1886, again in 1888 over Lillywhite's Rugby Union team and finally a New Zealand Māori side in 1889. By this time, Summer Hill had joined the NDFA and junior teams in Centennials, Carltons and Warwicks. An exhibition game was played in Easter of 1889 in the town of Dungog, north of Maitland, with Merewether joining the NDFA that same year. Exhilaration in Australian rules intensified around the same time as the Black Diamond Challenge Cup was introduced by the Northern District FA. The Black Diamond Challenge Cup created a strong feeling of elation and interest, with association games and representative games being played in front of many numbers of spectators, making Australian rules football the premier sport in the district. A game between Wallsend and Northumberland drew a crowd of almost 4,000 people. Fitzroy returned to Newcastle in 1889 and faced Wallsend, with the game attracting over 5,000 spectators. Special trains, buses and ferries were undertaken for followers to attend the games. Later in 1889 a combined Northern District side travelled to Victoria to play a series of matches against the VFA, Ballarat, Carlton, St Kilda and Fitzroy.

The Wallsend club saw a big advantage with the town's two large mines attracting a large number of migrants, many of which were from goldfields in Victoria, and making Wallsend the largest settlement outside of Newcastle. The club had been the dominant club in the competition since 1884 and played Sydney for the premiership of the Colony the following year in 1885. At least 2,000 people watched Wallsend emerge victorious over Sydney at the Wallsend Cricket Ground. However, Wallsend lost the following year, and were not able to win the championship again until 1889. Wallsend played a Tasmanian side in 1890 and recorded a draw.

The Northern District Football Association introduced a junior competition in 1888 and was looking at protecting clubs with less experience from heavy losses by the Wallsenders, in conjunction with the senior association to counter the wider standards in standards of playing. However the association had to use a handicapping system for Duncanson Cup matches as there wasn't enough teams to form two grades. This turned out to be unsuccessful, with Wallsend again emerging victorious and the extra men reported to be more of an impediment.

Depression 
In the 1890s the sport began to diminish by the combined effects of the depression at the time, as well as the decline of mines in Newcastle and unsound administration, just as it has established itself as the premier sport in the region and had prospered from the spike in population during the mining boom of the 1880s. Over 7,000 people left the Hunter region, many of those being followers of Australian football. Interest in the game plummeted as cubs were struggling to field teams. By 1895, there was not more Australian rules in Newcastle. Many former players converted to rugby union.

Clubs in the Northern District Football Association from 1881-94 
A number of clubs had competed in the NDFA from 1881 to 1894 due to the popularity of football, but many had folded within a year, often due to lack of experience

1881: Northumberland

1883: Lambton, Singleton, Newcastle City, Wallsend & Plattsburg

1885: West Maitland Half Holiday Club

1886: Stockton 2nds, Carlton 2nds, Summer Hill, Mount Zion, Rix's Creek, Morpeth

1887: Our Boys 2nds, Hamilton, Northumberland 2nds, Oakhampton 2nds, Lochinvar

1888: Wallsend Juniors, Merewether, Burwood United

1890: Tighes Hill, Broadmeadow Juniors, Charlestown, Vulcans, Rovers, Hamilton Juniors

1900s 
Some unsuccessful attempts were made to restore Australian rules in Newcastle in 1903, 1919 and 1935. An earlier attempt was made in 1898 which saw the reformation of clubs in Maitland and Wallsend before falling away again in 1903. By 1903, the economy had recovered from the depression of the 1890s. The New South Wales Australian National Football League (NSWANFL) encouraged the now-named Northern District Football League to expand the number of clubs to 18 and number of grades of 3 in 1904. Further support for football was expected to go back up when the Melbourne Football Club visited Newcastle later in 1904. However, only three clubs were skilful enough to play in the senior competition, in which the league asked clubs to develop juniors in an ill-fated attempt to create more senior teams in 1906. By this time many mines in Newcastle were shut down with miners forced to seek employment elsewhere. That same year saw the number of teams reduced to 11 with only one club, Hamilton, remaining in 1907 and the NDFL disbanding before the season had started.

It wasn't until 1919 when the game was played again in Newcastle when miners from Broken Hill, along with 17,000 other people drawn to Newcastle looking for work in heavy industries, set in motion the formation of the Newcastle Australian Rules Football League (NARFL). Most of the players were miners from Broken Hill, Sydney, South Australia, Victoria and Western Australia. The league saw the entry of industry-based clubs BHP, Nailworks and Rylands, as well as the code's confinement to people working in the industry. The sporting public of Newcastle didn't accept Australian rules football, with rugby league being the most popular code in the region by this time, and crowds were small at games with only three to four teams making up the competition. St Kilda, who were now in the Victorian Football League, visited Newcastle again in 1922, making the NARFL confident that the game would gain ground again. During the early 1920s unemployment and legacies from World War I that had ended just four years prior, brought Newcastle to a halt, prompted a number of its population to move away and saw the recession of the league in 1922 and 1923, which destroyed the minuscule possibility of the sport's revival. Nailworks had folded and both BHP and Rylands had been heavily weakened. The economy had recovered again in 1924 but Australian rules football didn't, and went into recess in 1925 before returning again in 1935. The game returned with the help from players from Sydney, Broken Hill and various other places across Australia trying to find jobs in the post-depression industry. the Collingwood and South Melbourne football clubs were sent to Newcastle by the VFL, which didn't do very much in promoting the game. The league that had been reformed relied on clubs in Sydney to play the three clubs in Newcastle at the time to try and grow the game within the city. Again, Newcastle's sporting community weren't supportive of Australian rules, with the league being abandoned again in 1939 at the start of World War II.

Post-World War II 
The Second World War saw the start of a large industrial development in Newcastle, enticing a large number of workers to the city. From 1943 until 1945, Newcastle industrial worker Alan Gilpin organised social matches of Australian rules between army camps in Maitland and Singleton. A formal platform was adopted which saw a Newcastle team play challenge games against clubs in Sydney, which Gilpin used to create the Newcastle Australian National Football League (NANFL) in 1948 with the founding clubs of the new league being Broadmeadow, Waratah, Mayfield and Newcastle City. Many of the players of the four clubs were soldiers stationed in Newcastle after the end of WWII or industrial workers from Victoria or South Australia. By 1952, the NANFL had expanded to a number of 14 clubs and 3 grades. Wickham Oval was granted access for the NANFL to use for Finals the following year in 1953. Crowds at NANFL Finals games were good and the league saw further prestige when player Neil Dunn became the first player in the Newcastle league to represent New South Wales. A third junior grade side was introduced in 1957 and at this point, the clubs in Newcastle had been stronger than they had been in their existence. The league also noted that spectator interest was 'more intense' and more players were attracted to the sport. However, the sport couldn't bear the recession in the early 1960s sufficiently, which saw the loss of many players, crowd numbers dropping and poor administration which was damaging to the NANFL. The standard of play within the league plummeted, along with publicity and promotion. The league hit its worst point in 1969 with only three known club to field a senior team, no liaison with schools and junior football to be  scrapped altogether. It was believed that after the elected executives left the office, Australian rules football would never be played again in Newcastle.

Bill Elliott, a former Australian wrestling champion from Victoria, undertook the role of President of the NANFL to salvage the struggling competition. However the disregarding of the game by the Newcastle public and the uncertainty of the sport's future within the region caused the fortunes of football within schools to fluctuate.

By 1970, three new clubs had joined the senior league with the sport gaining momentum when a representative team from Newcastle won the New South Wales Country Championships in 1971. Public awareness of the code had increased, game attendances were starting to be recorded with record crowds witnessing the Finals series of 1974. It seemed Australian rules was finally accepted in Newcastle. VFL clubs North Melbourne and Geelong were invited to play a promotional game in Newcastle in 1975, organised by the NAFL to '. . . promulgate Australia's National game in Newcastle', the league ensuring as much success as possible by distributing free entry to schoolchildren and having the media publicise the game and also proposing to pay for the expense of both teams, a rather costly mistake. The league was advised to offer the clubs 80% of the gate takings and if they didn't accept, to forget the game. The league relied on sponsorship generated by raffles which failed, resulting in the league losing $7,000 and $5,000 being owed to Ansett for transporting the Victorian clubs. However the NAFL was unable to pay the company, which resulted in rumours spreading that the league could fold. The NAFL, after requesting more time to pay Ansett, imposed a series of levies on its clubs, which were to be paid in five instalments over the course of twelve months. Many clubs were disconcerted with the match's organisation, some even disagreeing with the levies system the league imposed. Waratah-Mayfield and RAAF refused to pay the levies. The matter capitulated although RAAF persisted and didn't compete in the 1976 NAFL season. Gosford, who had joined in 1971, left and became one of the inaugural clubs of the CCAFL.

Later 1900s 
By 1976 the league's future however, looked promising. There was an extend of support for Australian rules football in Newcastle, which saw the inauguration of the Lions' Cup, a school competition for Newcastle schools. At first there were sixteen schools in Newcastle competing for the Lions' Cup before expanding into Sydney, the Central Coast and the South Coast. 45 schools competed in 1980 and by 1983, a total of 69 schools competed in the Lions' Cup; 15 from Newcastle, 6 from the Central Coast, 6 from the South Coast and 42 from Sydney. Many clubs in the league such as Warners Bay have benefited from the Lions' Cup.

At the end of the 1999 season, it was decided to merge the Newcastle league with the Central Coast league to create a more stable competition, as only 7 clubs and 6 clubs had competed in the Newcastle and Central Coast competitions respectively. This league was known as the Black Diamond Australian Football League from 2000 to 2018. From 2019 onward, it has been known as AFL Hunter Central Coast.

Clubs
The clubs that have played in the Newcastle AFL since it was reformed in 1948 and merged with the CCAFL after the 1999 season.

Cardiff
Waratah
Mayfield
Newcastle City
Broadmeadow
RAAF (later Williamtown Jets)
Hamilton
Newcastle University
Western Suburbs (later West Newcastle)
Lakeside
Macquarie
Wallsend
Warners Bay 
Singleton (previously Army)
Raymond Terrace
Muswellbrook
Nelson Bay
Maitland
Coalfields United
Gosford
Forster

Newcastle Australian Football League Premiers
The competition from 1886 to 1894 was known as the Northern Districts Football Association.

The premiers from 1948 to 1999 when the Newcastle Australian National Football League was re-established.

From 2000 onward the Premiers are listed under the Black Diamond Australian Football League

References

See also
AFL NSW/ACT
Australian rules football in New South Wales
Black Diamond Australian Football League

Sport in Newcastle, New South Wales
Australian rules football competitions in New South Wales